Oberstarzt (OTA) is a military rank in German speaking armed forces. It denotes a medical staff officer surgeon or medical staff officer dentist and is comparable to Colonel (de: Oberst) or Captain (naval) (de: Kapitän zur See) NATO-Rangcode OF5 in anglophone armed forces.

Germany

Bundeswehr
In the Joint Medical Service of the German Bundeswehr 
Oberstarzt, Oberstapotheker, and Oberstveterinär are comparable in NATO to the OF-5 rank Oberst;  Flottenarzt, and Flottenapotheker are equivalent to Kapitän zur See, OF-5 as well.

Address
The manner of formal addressing of military surgeons/dentists with the rank Oberstarzt is "Herr/Frau Oberstarzt"; with the rank Oberstapotheker, "Herr/Frau Oberstapotheker". Military surgeons/dentists with the rank Flottenarzt are addressed "Herr/Frau Flottenarzt"; with the rank Flottenapotheker, "Herr/Frau Flottenapotheker".

The "Inspector of veterinary medicine of the Bundeswehr" (de: Inspizient Veterinärmedizin der Bundeswehr) holds the rank Oberstveterinär.

Rank insignias
On the shoulder straps (Heer, Luftwaffe) there are three silver stars in silver oak leaves and the career insignia (de: Laufbahnabzeichen) as symbol of the medical standing, or course of studies. The piping on shoulder straps shows the Waffenfarbe (en: corps- or troop-function colour), corresponding to the appropriate military service, branch, or special force. The corps colour of the Bundeswehr Joint Medical Service is dark blue.

In the Marines, the career insignia is in the middle of both sleeves, 3 cm above the cuff strips, and on the shoulder straps between strips and button.

Wehrmacht
Oberstarzt of the German Wehrmacht was comparable to the Oberst (OF-5), as well as to the Standartenführer and Oberst of the Waffen-SS. In line to the so-called Reichsbesoldungsordnung (en: Reich's salary order), appendixes to the Salary law of the German Empire (de: Besoldungsgesetz des Deutschen Reiches) of 1927 (changes 1937 – 1940), the comparative ranks were as follows: C 4

Oberst (Heer and Luftwaffe)
Kapitän zur See (Kriegsmarine)
Oberstarzt from 1934 (medical service of the Wehrmacht)
Flottenarzt, introduced June 26, 1935 (medical service of the Kriegsmarine)
Oberstveterinär from 1934 (veterinarian service of the Wehrmacht)

During wartime, regular assignments of Oberstarzt was Division surgeon – IVb (de: Divisionsarzt – IVb).

The corps colour of the military Health Service Support (HSS) in German armed forces was traditional dark blue, and of the veterinarian service . This tradition was continued by the medical service corps in Heer and Luftwaffe of the Reichswehr and Wehrmacht.

 Rank insignias

Address 
The manner of formal addressing of military surgeons/dentists with the rank Oberstarzt was, "Herr Oberstarzt"; with the rank Flottenarz - "Herr Flottenarzt".

Austria-Hungary 

In the Imperial & Royal Common Army of Austria-Hungary (de: Gemeinsame Armee or k.u.k. Armee) there was the rank Oberstabsarzt 1. Klasse (en: Senior staff surgeon 1st class) until 1918, equivalent to Oberstarzt in Germany. That particular rank was comparable to the Oberst OF5-rank (en: colonel) as well. There was also a rank Oberstabsarzt 2. Klasse (or másodosztályú fõtörzsorvos in Hungarian).

Officers with that rank 
 Andreas Mollat (1802-1891) k. k. Oberststabsarzt

References 

Military ranks of Austria
Military ranks of Germany